The Price We Pay is a 2022 American horror film directed by Ryuhei Kitamura and starring Emile Hirsch and Stephen Dorff. The film was released on video on demand on January 10, 2023, and in select theaters on January 13, 2023.

Plot 
After turning a trick, a streetwalker is abandoned at a lonely gas station far from town. After she has looked through the wallet that she has stolen from the john, someone shoots her with a tranquilizer dart and abducts her.

Grace is in the middle of negotiating with a pawn shop owner over payments she is unable to make when the pawn shop is robbed by Alex, Cody, and Alex's brother Shane. The owner shoots Shane in the leg and is shot dead himself. The getaway driver hears the gunshots and flees. Alex and Cody get a worker to open the safe, then trigger-happy Alex shoots the worker. Grace, having witnessed these murders, is forced by the three robbers to drive them away, but her car breaks down so robber Cody and Grace pretend to be on their way to visit relatives and convince a young farmhand named Danny to let them wait a few hours in his farmhouse for Cody's supposed brother.

After Cody removes the bullet from Shane's leg, Alex becomes suspicious and investigates what Danny is doing. He discovers a secret dungeon just as Danny's doctor grandfather and the towering Jodi return home. The kidnapped streetwalker awakens in the basement and begins to exit but spooks Alex, who shoots her. As he is looking at the body, Jodi captures him. The doctor shoots Cody and Grace with tranquilizer darts as Danny pleads with them not to hurt Grace because she is not one of them. Alex wakes up on an operating table next to Shane, who is awake and in distress because his organs are exposed. The doctor removes Shane's heart, explaining how his daughter was hurt by evil men like them and explaining that his granddaughter Jodi's beautiful smile was disfigured and is now covered by a bandage. He explains that Alex has ruined their catch for the night by killing her and that Alex's organs have been ruined from drug use but that his eyes are still healthy and valuable on the black market. The doctor then cuts out his eyes.

In another room, Grace begs Danny to help her escape, but Danny merely tells her that her death will not be painful, connecting an IV bag to the cannula in the vein in her arm before leaving. Cody wakes up in the same room and manages to shift his operating table closer to hers to break the IV line going into her arm as Jodi comes in and takes him to the operating room, where Alex's eyes have been removed. The doctor has no further use for Alex and lets Jodi take him to another room to play, where she releases the straps holding him down and hands him a switchblade. He attempts to attack her but she easily overcomes him and slits his throat.

As the doctor cuts open Cody to remove his organs, Danny slides the tray of medical tools closer to Grace so that she can grab a scalpel and cut the straps holding her down. She attacks the doctor, who falls onto and is bitten by Cody. Grace smashes open a canister of compressed gas, which flies into the doctor's head and pushes him into the wall, bursting his head into pieces. Jodi returns but Danny locks her out of the room. Together Danny and Grace staple Cody back shut. Cody tells Danny to help Grace escape and that he will buy them some time, then gets Grace to inject him with adrenaline. Grace and Danny escape into a passageway between the walls as Jodi returns and quickly kills Cody after a brief fight. Jodi reaches through the wall and grabs Grace, who shoots her, causing her to drop her electrified bat. Danny grabs the bat and sticks it in Jodi's stomach, causing her to drop to the floor as they escape up a ladder. When Jodi tries to follow, they pour a dissolving solution from one of the nearby barrels over her. The disfigured Jodi continues to chase them, but is shot with multiple tranquilizer darts by Danny. Enraged, Jodi tries to kill Danny, but Grace wraps barbed wire from the nearby fence around her face and Danny turns on a machine to tighten the wire as she screams, "Brother!" Grace plunges a scythe into Jodi's stomach and the barbed wire tears Jodi's head from her body.

Grace and Danny get into the doctor's truck and Danny asks, "Where do we go from here?" Grace replies, "No idea. Wanna find out?" Then the two survivors drive away from the farmhouse.

Cast
Emile Hirsch as Alex
Stephen Dorff as Cody
Gigi Zumbado as Grace
Vernon Wells as The Doctor
Tyler Sanders as Danny
Tanner Zagarino as Shane
Amazon Eve as Jodi
Sabina Mach as Carly
Jesse Kinser as John
Heath Hensley as Mr. Fuller
Chelsea Hunter as News Broadcaster
Takaaki Hirakawa as Cashier
Nick Check as Pawn Shop Worker
Christopher Robleto-Harvey as Harvey (as Christopher Robleto)
Eleanor Burke as Carly (voice)

Production
Filming wrapped in Las Cruces, New Mexico in September 2021.

The film is dedicated to the memory of Tyler Sanders (2004-2022).

Reception
Joel Harley of Starburst awarded the film three stars.

Film critic Kim Newman wrote that while the film is "not very good", it "keeps on swinging, offering non-stop eyekicks, excitement and gross-out".

References

External links
 

2022 horror films
2020s English-language films
American horror films
Films about organ trafficking
Films directed by Ryuhei Kitamura
Films shot in New Mexico